What Maisie Knew is a novel by Henry James, first published as a serial in The Chap-Book and (revised and abridged) in the New Review in 1897 and then as a book later that year. It tells the story of the sensitive daughter of divorced, irresponsible and narcissistic parents. The book follows the title character from earliest childhood to precocious maturity.

Plot summary 

When Beale and Ida Farange are divorced, the court decrees that their only child, the very young Maisie, will shuttle back and forth between them, spending six months of the year with each. The parents are immoral and frivolous, and they use Maisie to intensify their hatred of each other. Beale Farange marries Miss Overmore, Maisie's pretty governess, while Ida marries the likeable but weak Sir Claude. Maisie gets a new governess: the frumpy, somewhat ridiculous, but devoted Mrs. Wix.

Both Ida and Beale soon cheat on their spouses; in turn, Sir Claude and the new Mrs. Farange begin an affair with each other. Maisie's parents abandon her and she becomes largely the responsibility of Sir Claude. Eventually, Maisie must decide if she wants to remain with Sir Claude and Mrs. Farange. In the book's long final section, set in France, the older (probably teenaged) Maisie struggles to choose between them and Mrs Wix, and concludes that her new parents' relationship will likely end as her biological parents' did. She leaves them and goes to stay with Mrs. Wix, her most reliable adult guardian.

Literary significance and criticism
What Maisie Knew has attained a fairly strong critical position in the Jamesian canon. Edmund Wilson was one of many critics who admired both the book's technical proficiency and its judgment of a negligent and damaged society. When Wilson recommended What Maisie Knew to Vladimir Nabokov, the author of Lolita, Nabokov said he thought the book was terrible. F. R. Leavis, on the other hand, declared the book to be "perfection". The psychoanalytic critic Neil Hertz has argued for a parallel between James' narrative voice and the problem of transference in Freud's Dora case.

An eponymous film adaptation was released in 2012, directed by Scott McGehee and David Siegel, and starring Julianne Moore, Alexander Skarsgård, and Onata Aprile. It is based largely on James' plot, with some alterations. The film is set in present-day New York City, and the professions of Maisie's parents are changed. Unlike in the book, Maisie's step parents are highly dependable and love her and each other deeply. Maisie finds a happy life with them, and the character of Mrs. Wix is virtually eliminated.

References

Bibliography

External links

  

 
 

1897 British novels
1897 American novels
Novels by Henry James
Novels first published in serial form
British bildungsromans
Works originally published in The Chap-Book
Heinemann (publisher) books
American novels adapted into films
British novels adapted into films
Novels about dysfunctional families
Narcissism in fiction